Foots Cray Meadows is an area of parkland and woodland 97 hectares (240 acres) in size, within the London Borough of Bexley, England. It borders the suburbs of Albany Park, Sidcup, Foots Cray, North Cray and Ruxley. The River Cray runs through it in a north-easterly direction. The London Loop, a public recreational walking path around London, also known as the "M25 for walkers", runs through the meadows parallel to the river from Sidcup Place, just south of the meadows. Two notable bridges cross the River Cray in the meadows: Five Arches bridge and the smaller Penny Farthing Bridge.

The Meadows are a Local Nature Reserve and a Site of Metropolitan Importance for Nature Conservation. They have also received a Green Flag Award. There is access from Rectory Lane, among other places. Adjacent to the meadows is what was the kitchen garden and stables of the Foots Cray Place estate and which included a boules alley with a summer house which is still standing.

History
The area was originally a part of the Foots Cray Place estate, and during the 18th century the Five Arches bridge was built. At the same time, an almshouse was built adjacent to the woods, which, as of 2008, was being excavated by archaeologists belonging to Bexley Archaeological Group. Bexley Archaeological Group

On 18 October 1949 Foots Cray Place caught fire and the house was destroyed. The ruins were subsequently demolished and the grounds became Foots Cray Meadows, a public park.  

In the early 2000s, Five Arches bridge was renovated with new stone, along with the 'Penny Farthing' bridge just upstream.

Gallery

References

Copies of A History of Footscray can be purchased from Bexley Archaeological Group Bexley Archaeological Group

Bibliography

External links
 Friends of Foots Cray Meadows

Parks and open spaces in the London Borough of Bexley
Local nature reserves in Greater London
Meadows in Greater London
Nature reserves in the London Borough of Bexley
Sidcup